Wendell Lewis (born September 21, 1989) is an American professional basketball playerPlus League for of the . Before, he has played professionally in Lebanon, Mexico, Georgia and Japan.

Lewis played for Chernomorets from 2020 to 2022. He averaged 19.6 points, 8.7 rebounds, 1.5 steals and 1.1 assists per game in the 2021-22 season. On February 25, 2022, Lewis signed with Benfica.

References

External links
RealGM profile
Mississippi State Bulldogs bio

1989 births
Living people
Alabama State Hornets basketball players
American expatriate basketball people in Bulgaria
American expatriate basketball people in Georgia (country)
American expatriate basketball people in Japan
American expatriate basketball people in Lebanon
American expatriate basketball people in Mexico
American men's basketball players
Basketball players from Alabama
Mississippi State Bulldogs men's basketball players
Sportspeople from Selma, Alabama
Halcones de Ciudad Obregón players
Saitama Broncos players
S.L. Benfica basketball players
Tokyo Hachioji Bee Trains players
Power forwards (basketball)